Hubert Drouais (5 May 1699 1 – 9 February 1767) was a French painter, portraitist and miniaturist.

Drouais was born in Pont-Audemer in Normandy, the son of Anne Talon and the painter Jean Drouais. Hubert followed in his father’s footsteps and received his first lessons from him before leaving for Rouen to further his skills. He then decided to make it to Paris, although he was so poor that, unable to afford the cost of the trip, he had to work his way on the road to his destination.

He devoted himself particularly to the portrait, and was the best pupil of the portraitist François de Troy, who is linked through his own master and through Rigaud to the grand tradition of Van Dyck. He soon acquired an ease that made him look like one of the first painters in this genre. As he was making progress, he would visit his homeland, as if to honor it with his first successes. His father’s approval and his countrymen’s encouragements were his sweetest rewards. He excelled in the genres of portraiture and  miniature. Although in different parts that characterize a good painter, one who has done most to admire its color is fresh and bright.

On the death of Troy, Drouais was employed by Jean-Baptiste van Loo, Jean-Baptiste Oudry and Jean-Marc Nattier. He was in fashion at the court of Louis XV as a portraitist, painting not only princes and princesses, but the actresses of Comédie-Française and opera girls, like the Camargo, Mlle Gautier, Mlle Pelissier, the Gaussin, as well.

Drouais was received at the Académie de peinture et de sculpture on November 29, 1730. At his death, rue des Orties, his funeral was celebrated at the Église Saint-Roch. He had two children with Margaret Lusurier whom he had married on February 22, 1727. His son François-Hubert, whose first master he was, and his grandson Jean-Germain were painters like him and in his old age he had the satisfaction to see his son also enter the Académie de peinture. He died at Paris.

Works 
 Robert le Lorrain (1666–1743)
 Mademoiselle Marie Pelissier
 Joseph Christophe (1662–1748)
 Mademoiselle Gauthier, 1737
 Madame de France, 1741
 Monsieur le Vicomte de Courtenier, 1741
 Madame la Vicomtesse de Courtenier, 1741
 Madame Héry
 Madame Courgy
 Mademoiselle Gossin tenant un livre, 1746
 Mademoiselle Drouais, sa fille, tenant un chat, 1746
 Le Fils de l’auteur, 1746
 Monsieur Jacquemain tenant un crayon, 1746
 Mademoiselle ***, 1746
 Mademoiselle *** tenant des fleurs, 1746
 Demoiselle qui rit, 1746
 La Camargo.
The Dauphin Louis de Bourbon, Ca. 1744.

Notes

Bibliography 

  C. Gabillot, « Les Trois Drouais », in Gazette des Beaux-Arts, vol. II; 1906, vol. I, 1905.

1699 births
1767 deaths
18th-century French painters
French male painters
18th-century French male artists